Hofsteniola is a genus of worms belonging to the family Hofsteniidae.

Species:
 Hofsteniola pardii Papi, 1957

References

Acoelomorphs